Matthew Read may refer to:

Matt Read, Canadian ice hockey player
Matthew Read (chess boxer)
Matthew Read (screenwriter) and producer

See also
Matthew Reed (disambiguation)
Matthew Reid (disambiguation)
Matt Rhead, English footballer